Ronald Prince (born 13 February 1979) is an Australian former professional rugby league footballer who played for the Cronulla-Sutherland Sharks and the Parramatta Eels in the NRL.

Playing career
Prince made his NRL debut for Cronulla in round 14 of the 2000 NRL season in a 28–8 victory over the Northern Eagles.  In 2003, Prince joined Parramatta and played 5 games for them over two seasons.  In round 4 of the 2004 NRL season, Prince suffered a season ending knee injury against Canberra.  This would prove to be the last NRL game Prince would play in.

References

1979 births
Living people
Cronulla-Sutherland Sharks players
Parramatta Eels players
Australian rugby league players
Rugby league wingers
Place of birth missing (living people)